Tai is a fictional character appearing in American comic books published by Marvel Comics. A Cambodian, Tai was something of a mentor for the New Warriors in the first 25 issues of their first series.

Fictional character biography
Tai is an elderly Cambodian mystic who was indirectly responsible for the formation of the New Warriors. Tai was born into a cult called the Dragon's Breadth. Her people derive mystical energy from a well inside their temple that was a nexus into various alternate dimensions. The temple is constructed around the nexus point where vast amounts of mystic energy are constantly released. Throughout the centuries Tai's people absorb the energy from the well. They devise a detailed program of interbreeding the goal of which was for each successive generation to be able to tap into the energies of the well more than the previous generation had and that eventually one generation would use that power to rule the world (this plan was called 'The Pact'). Tai's generation are actually able to harness the energies of the well. Tai's generation is led to believe that their generation were the ones who would rule the world. Tai refuses to share powers and slays everyone in the cult but six maiden brides and a series of guards for the temple.

Vietnam  War

During the Vietnam War a unit of American soldiers calling themselves the Half-Fulls encounter the temple but were captured by Tai. Tai tells them the story of her people and  that the six soldiers had to marry and procreate with the six maiden brides. All but one of them agree to do so (Daryl Taylor was already married).

After their tour the soldiers return home to America with their new brides. Tai remains in Cambodia. Tai had married her only daughter Miyami off to one of the soldiers Andrew Chord, who was an African American. Miyami soon gave birth to two children Silhouette and Aaron Midnight's Fire. Miyami did not want her children to be used as Tai's pawns so she fakes their deaths as well as her own and leaves her children to be raised in Manhattan's Chinatown.

Chord's mercenary efforts

Chord, thinking his family is dead, became a mercenary and traveled the world. Eventually he arrives in Cambodia and renews his association with his mother-in-law. Together they return to America. Tai worries her son-in-law fears his place in the pact would be moot now that his son was dead. Tai urges Chord to resume his friendship with army buddy Daryl Taylor (the one who rejected the pact). Chord did so and became godfather to Daryl and his wife's son Dwayne. Tai demands Chord kill Daryl and his wife Melody. Chord did so, unwillingly, in front of Dwayne. At which point a six-year-old Dwayne is introduced to Tai and his memory wiped.

'Motherhood'

Chord and Tai raise Dwayne and train him to be a crime fighter. They also take care of Daryl Taylor's charitable organization the Taylor Foundation...often using it to finance questionable activities all over the world. Dwayne became Night Thrasher and was briefly a part of a team with Tai's grandchildren Midnight's Fire and Silhouette. At the time the three were unaware of the relevant biological relationship. Later Night Thrasher founds the New Warriors. Tai influences the group from behind the scenes. In "New Warriors" #8, she bets the safety and security of the Warriors on a conflict with Emma Frost. The  other woman had brought her own super-powered teens in order to bring back one of the Warriors, who used to be her student. Frost's team is defeated.

Tai hopes to sacrifice the New Warriors to the well instead of the super-powered members of the 'Folding Circle' (the children born from the mating of the soldiers and the brides). Tai and Chord's illegal business dealings are exposed and Chord attempts suicide rather than admit the truth. While in the hospital his wife Miyami visited him. Tai discovers this and is enraged that her daughter had faked her death and the deaths of her grandchildren. Tai murders her daughter in a fit of anger. Tai also uses her power to heal Chord of his brutal injuries, though she is unable to completely restore him.

Tai later returns to Cambodia. She was soon followed by the Folding Circle, now led by the Left Hand, a rogue powered villain influenced by the energies of the well. The New Warriors also follow in an Avengers Quinjet. Tai attempts to sacrifice both groups to the well. They work together to try and save each other, but it comes down to Dwayne himself in "New Warriors" #25. Dwayne uses a submachine-gun (specifically, an Uzi) to injure and seemingly kill Tai. Both she and the Left Hand are sucked down into the well.

Post-death

Tai has appeared a couple times since her death in time travel storylines. In a storyline in Darkhawk, Tai's granddaughter Silhouette is sent back in time to stop Tai from murdering Miyami. In a storyline in the "Night Thrasher" comic book series, Silhouette is sent back in time to Tai's childhood. She encounters Tai and her peers as children in the cult. The five-year-old Tai tells Silhouette she can send her home if Silhouette will murder one of her rivals. Silhouette refuses and murders her grandmother as a child.

Powers and abilities

Tai exhibited various mystical abilities, as well as physical enhancements. She was super-strong, had extremely sharp talon-like fingernails, and appeared immune to the effects of her aging. She could run at high speeds, leap further than normal human beings, see clearly in the dark, and showed the magical abilities to heal herself and others, fire blasts of magical energy, and Teleport. She was also a highly skilled martial combatant, able to confound the entire team of Hellions at once.

References

Comics characters introduced in 1989
Fictional Cambodian people
Characters created by Tom DeFalco
Characters created by Ron Frenz
Marvel Comics characters who use magic
Marvel Comics characters with superhuman strength
Marvel Comics female supervillains